Tin Pei Ling (born 23 December 1983) is a Singaporean politician and businesswoman. A member of the governing People's Action Party (PAP), she has been the Member of Parliament (MP) representing MacPherson SMC since 2015 and previously the MacPherson division of Marine Parade GRC between 2011 and 2015.

Tin was the PAP's youngest candidate during the 2011 general election.

Early life and education
Tin's father operated a coffeeshop in Ghim Moh while her mother was a housewife. 

She attended Crescent Girls' School and Hwa Chong Junior College before graduating from the National University of Singapore with a Bachelor of Social Sciences degree with honours in psychology.

From 2013 to 2015, Tin did a Master of Business Administration with University of Chicago Booth School of Business.

Tin's father was involved in grassroots work and Tin helped him with English translations. In her second year in university, she started helping out at Vivian Balakrishnan's Meet-the-People Sessions. 

Prior to the formation of the 17th Young PAP Executive Committee marked by the 2011 general election, Tin was the assistant treasurer for Young PAP and a representative for the Ulu Pandan Branch.

Business career
Prior to entering politics, Tin was a senior associate at Ernst & Young. She resigned after being elected as a Member of Parliament in the 2011 general election.

In May 2017, Tin started working at Jing King Tech Group, an investment firm, as its group director for corporate strategy before leaving to join Business China on 21 May 2018. 

Tin served as the chief executive officer of Business China—a government related non-profit organisation aiming to strengthen Singapore–China ties through the support of businesses—between May 2018 and December 2022.

In 2023, Tin initially accepted a role of Director of Public Affairs and Policy from Grab, a Singapore-based technology company. This led to public questions of possible conflicts of interest, as she was also the chairperson for the Communications and Information Government Parliamentary Committee (GPC). After several days, Grab decided to change Tin's role to that of a director of corporate development.

Political career 
Tin made her political debut in the 2011 general election as part of a five-member PAP team led by Prime Minister Goh Chok Tong, contesting in Marine Parade GRC and won 56.65% of the vote, defeating the National Solidarity Party (NSP) team led by Cheo Chai Chen.

Having been a member of the Young PAP at the Ulu Pandan branch for seven years, she was fielded by the PAP as a candidate to attract the "unpredictable" youth vote through social networking sites. Goh admitted after the election that Tin's youth and negative image perceived by the public was a "factor" for the PAP's weaker performance this election compared to their 72.9% win in 1992. 

On 1 June 2011, Tin announced on her Facebook account that she had resigned from her senior associate position in Ernst & Young, where she had worked for four years. She said the decision was made in order to focus on her responsibilities as full-time Member of Parliament for the MacPherson ward of Marine Parade GRC. Tin also did a Executive Master of Business Administration at the University of Chicago Booth School of Business during this period.

Tin's selection as a candidate for Parliament in 2011 resulted in a large online backlash, especially amongst young Singaporeans. Throughout the campaign, Tin garnered negative attention due to her perceived immaturity to become a Member of Parliament, and allusions were also raised as to how her husband's position had opened doors for her into politics. A widely circulated Facebook photo of Tin posing with a Kate Spade-branded gift from her husband, also led to widespread accusations online of ignorance, materialism and privilege. When asked if there was a policy she would change, she replied that there were no policy that she felt strongly against. When asked what her "greatest regret" was, she said it was not having brought her (still living) parents to Universal Studios Singapore.

Some Singaporeans were concerned that as an "undeserving [candidate]," Tin had a high chance of being elected "not on [her] own merit, but rather on the back of established Members of Parliament" since the five-member PAP team would be voted in or rejected as a group under Singapore's group representation constituency system.

The public's online hostility towards Tin was so great that Goh Chok Tong defended her in the press. He said he had taken Tin in when Prime Minister Lee Hsien Loong had offered her to be fielded as a candidate in Ang Mo Kio GRC. He had accepted her as he did not think Tin was a weak candidate. He dismissed the online criticisms as "distortion" and even though "some sound bites of her which pitted her as a rather light-weight person", it was just "a superficial view". He still believed that she "would work very hard", "[could] reach out to the young, and the not so young," that he "would like her to do more to help the old people in MacPherson," and that she would become "a good Member of Parliament in due course".

Nicole Seah, a candidate of the opposition NSP team contesting in Marine Parade GRC, filed a complaint to the Elections Department on 6 May 2011, stating that Tin had violated the state-mandated cooling-off period 24 hours before polls by posting a Facebook comment on Seah crying during her walkabout. Under the Singapore Parliamentary Elections Act, canvassing on Polling Day and Cooling Off Day is prohibited and the offence carries a fine or imprisonment or both. When questioned, Tin replied that one of her administrators, Denise He, had posted the comment under her account and that He had meant to post in her own capacity from her phone, but had forgotten to log out of Tin's account. The NSP team was advised by the Elections Department to file a police report before the Elections Department could investigate. The police confirmed that a report was lodged against her. The police issued a stern warning to Tin as well as Seah, who also had a similar complaint lodged against her.

During the 2015 general election, MacPherson SMC was split from Marine Parade GRC for the first time since the 2006 general election. 

She ran against Bernard Chen of the Workers' Party and Cheo of the National Solidarity Party. Cheo's campaign suffered a major blunder when he described Tin's new role as a mother as "her weakness" in the campaign. Facing public backlash, Cheo later claimed that this comment was meant as a joke. She won 65.58% of the vote, compared to Chen's 33.6% and Cheo's 0.82%.

During the 2020 general election, Tin defended her parliamentary seat in MacPherson SMC with 71.74% of the vote against Goh Meng Seng of the People's Power Party. She was later appointed as Chair of the Government Parliamentary Committee for Communications and Information in the 14th Parliament.

Personal life
Tin is married to Ng How Yue, Permanent Secretary (Health Development) in the Ministry of Health and formerly a Principal Private Secretary to Prime Minister Lee Hsien Loong. Tin and Ng have two children.

References

External links
 Tin Pei Ling on Parliament of Singapore
 
 

1983 births
Living people
Members of the Parliament of Singapore
People's Action Party politicians
National University of Singapore alumni
Hwa Chong Junior College alumni
Singaporean politicians of Chinese descent
Singaporean Buddhists
Singaporean women in politics
Ernst & Young people